Dialogues in Human Geography is a triannual peer-reviewed academic journal covering human geography. It was established in 2011 and is published by SAGE Publishing. The journal's founding editor was Rob Kitchin (Maynooth University) and the current managing editor is Reuben Rose-Redwood (University of Victoria). According to the Journal Citation Reports, the journal has a 2021 impact factor of 27.000, ranking it 1st out of 85 journals in the category "Geography."

References

External links

Human geography
Geography journals
SAGE Publishing academic journals
Triannual journals
English-language journals
Publications established in 2011
Academic journals published in the United Kingdom